The 4158th Strategic Wing is a discontinued United States Air Force unit.  It was active in Alaska from 1960 to 1966 as a control and support organization for Strategic Air Command (SAC) units deployed to Elmendorf Air Force Base, Alaska.

History and Operations
The 4158th Strategic Wing was organized in 1960 as the 4158th Combat Support Group, a command element for Strategic Air Command (SAC) units deployed to Elmendorf Air Force Base, Alaska. It was expanded to wing status in 1963.  It first assigned to Fifteenth Air Force, but on 1 July 1965 it was reassigned to the 18th Strategic Aerospace Division.

The wing commanded SAC elements deployed to Alaska during Reflex deployments from United States bases. Reflex deployments placed Boeing B-47 Stratojet strategic bombers on alert at forward locations, such as Elmendorf. Its major subordinate unit was the 73d Munitions Maintenance Squadron, which managed the special weapons for deployed units. It also supported deployed reconnaissance assets and a Tanker Task Force.

In 1964 the wing's buildings were damaged by an earthquake that shook Elmendorf. The 4158th was inactivated in 1966 after SAC Tanker Task Force commitments at Elmendorf terminated at the end of 1965. SAC operations in Alaska continued at Eielson Air Force Base.

Lineage
 Designated as the 4158th Combat Support Group and organized on 1 July 1960
 Redesignated 4158th Strategic Wing on 1 November 1963
 Discontinued on 25 June 1966

Assignments
 Fifteenth Air Force: 1 July 1960
 18th Strategic Aerospace Division: 1 July 1965 - 25 June 1966

Components
 73d Aviation Depot Squadron (later 73d Munitions Maintenance Squadron): 1 July 1960 - 25 June 1966

Stations
 Elmendorf Air Force Base, Alaska: 1 July 1960 - 25 June 1966

Notes

References 

 

Strategic wings of the United States Air Force
Four Digit Wings of the United States Air Force
Military units and formations established in 1960
Military units and formations disestablished in 1966